Langolen is a commune in the Finistère department of Brittany in north-western France.

The commune takes its name from Saint Collen, a 7th-century monk who is associated with the town of Llangollen in Wales and also with Cornwall.

Population
Inhabitants of Langolen are called in French Langolinois.

See also
Communes of the Finistère department

References

External links

Official website 

Mayors of Finistère Association 

Communes of Finistère